The Doboy Ward is a Brisbane City Council ward covering Carina, Hemmant, Murarrie, Tingalpa, and parts of Belmont, Cannon Hill, Manly West and Wakerley. The ward was created in 1982 and is currently represented by Lisa Atwood of the Liberal National Party.

Councillors for Doboy

Results

References

City of Brisbane wards